Ascobolus denudatus is a species of apothecial fungus belonging to the family Ascobolaceae.

This is an uncommon European species appearing as tiny yellow discs up to 1 mm across on rotting straw. It can be encountered at any time of year but is mainly seen from summer to early autumn.

References

Ascobolus denudatus at Species Fungorum

Pezizales
Fungi described in 1822
Taxa named by Elias Magnus Fries